Play to the Whistle is a British comedy panel game television programme which premiered on ITV on 11 April 2015 and is produced by Hungry Bear Media. In each regular episode two teams of three members – one member being a regular captain – compete in sports knowledge rounds and physical games to earn points, the team with the most points at the end is declared the winner. The show is presented by Holly Willoughby and the teams are captained by Bradley Walsh and Frank Lampard; the latter is joined by Romesh Ranganathan as a regular panelist. Seann Walsh has been the resident scorekeeper from the first series and also became the host's assistant from the second series. Jimmy Bullard was the host's assistant in the first series. As of 4 April 2017, nineteen regular episodes and a compilation special have been aired across three series; 20 episodes in total. Willoughby promoted the third and final series as a guest on The One Show on 27 February 2017.

Series overview

Key
Key to background colours
  – indicates Walsh's team won
  – indicates Lampard and Ranganathan's team won
  – indicates the game ended in a draw

Key to symbols
 A score in red indicates negative score
 An em dash (—) in the ratings indicates the viewing figures are not available
 "No." indicates the overall episode total

Episodes

Series 1 (2015)

Series 2 (2016)

Series 3 (2017)

Scores

Notes

References

External links
 
 

Lists of British comedy television series episodes
Lists of British non-fiction television series episodes